Diego Camacho y Ávila (12 November 1652 – 19 October 1712) was a Roman Catholic prelate who served as Archbishop (Personal Title) of Guadalajara (1695–1704), and Archbishop of Manila (1704–1712).

Biography
Diego Camacho y Ávila was born in Badajoz, Spain on 12 November 1652. On 28 November 1695, he was appointed during the papacy of Pope Innocent XII as Archbishop of Manila. On 19 August 1696, he was consecrated bishop by Manuel Fernández de Santa Cruz y Sahagún, Bishop of Tlaxcala. On 14 January 1704, he was appointed during the papacy of Pope Clement XI as Archbishop (Personal Title) of Guadalajara and installed on 24 May 1707. He served as Bishop of Guadalajara until his death on 19 October 1712. While bishop, he was the principal consecrator of Miguel Bayot, Bishop of Cebú (1699).

References

External links and additional sources
 (for Chronology of Bishops) 
 (for Chronology of Bishops) 
 (for Chronology of Bishops) 
 (for Chronology of Bishops) 

17th-century Roman Catholic bishops in Mexico
18th-century Roman Catholic bishops in the Philippines
Bishops appointed by Pope Innocent XII
Bishops appointed by Pope Clement XI
1652 births
1712 deaths
Roman Catholic Archdiocese of Manila